This is a list of Canadians who have won gold medals in the Summer Olympics:

2020 Summer Olympics 

Maggie Mac Neil – Swimming, Women's 100m butterfly
Maude Charron - Weightlifting, Women's 64kg
Susanne Grainger, Lisa Roman, Christine Roper, Sydney Payne, Madison Mailey, Kasia Gruchalla-Wesierski, Avalon Wasteneys, Andrea Proske, and Kristen Kit (cox) - Rowing, Women's eight
Andre De Grasse – Athletics, Men's 200 m
Damian Warner – Athletics, Men's decathlon
Canada women's national soccer team: Janine Beckie, Kadeisha Buchanan, Gabrielle Carle, Jessie Fleming, Vanessa Gilles, Julia Grosso, Jordyn Huitema, Stephanie Labbé, Ashley Lawrence, Adriana Leon, Erin McLeod, Nichelle Prince, Quinn, Jayde Riviere, Deanne Rose, Sophie Schmidt, Desiree Scott, Kailen Sheridan, Christine Sinclair, Évelyne Viens, and Shelina Zadorsky- Soccer, Women's team
Kelsey Mitchell - Cycling, Women's track cycling sprint

2016 Summer Olympics 

Penny Oleksiak – Swimming, Women's 100m freestyle
Rosannagh MacLennan – Trampoline
Derek Drouin – Athletics, Men's high jump
Erica Wiebe - Wrestling, Women's freestyle 75 kg

2012 Summer Olympics

Rosannagh MacLennan – Trampoline
Christine Girard – Weightlifting

2008 Summer Olympics

Carol Huynh – Wrestling, Women's Freestyle 48 kg
 – Rowing, Men's eight
Eric Lamaze on Hickstead – Equestrian, Individual jumping

2004 Summer Olympics

Kyle Shewfelt – Gymnastics, Men's Floor Exercises
Lori-Ann Muenzer – Cycling, Women's Sprint
Adam van Koeverden – Canoeing, Men's K-1 500 m

2000 Summer Olympics

Simon Whitfield – Triathlon, Men's Competition
Daniel Igali – Wrestling, Men's Freestyle Lightweight (69 kg)
Sébastien Lareau and Daniel Nestor – Tennis, Men's Doubles

1996 Summer Olympics

Donovan Bailey – Athletics, Men's 100 m
Robert Esmie, Glenroy Gilbert, Bruny Surin, Carlton Chambers, Donovan Bailey – Athletics, Men's 4 × 100 m Relay
Marnie McBean and Kathleen Heddle – Rowing, Women's Double Sculls

1992 Summer Olympics

Mark McKoy – Athletics, Men's 110 m Hurdles
John Wallace, Bruce Robertson, Michael Forgeron, Darren Barber, Robert Marland, Michael Rascher, Andy Crosby, Derek Porter and Terrence Paul – Rowing, Men's Eights with Coxswain
Kathleen Heddle and Marnie McBean – Rowing, Women's Pairs
Kay Worthington, Kirsten Barnes, Jessica Monroe, and Brenda Taylor – Rowing, Women's Coxless Fours
Marnie McBean, Kathleen Heddle, Kirsten Barnes, Brenda Taylor, Jessica Monroe, Kay Worthington, Megan Delehanty, Shannon Crawford and Lesley Thompson – Rowing, Women's Eights with Coxswain
Mark Tewksbury – Swimming, Men's 100 m Backstroke
Sylvie Fréchette – Synchronized Swimming, Women's Solo

1988 Summer Olympics

Lennox Lewis – Boxing, Men's Super Heavyweight
Carolyn Waldo and Michelle Cameron – Synchronized Swimming, Women's Duet
Carolyn Waldo – Synchronized Swimming, Women's Solo

1984 Summer Olympics

 Larry Cain – Canoeing, Men's C-1 500 m
 Alwyn Morris and Hugh Fisher – Canoeing, Men's K-2 1000 m
 Sylvie Bernier – Diving, Women's 3 m Springboard
 Lori Fung – Rhythmic Gymnastics, Women's Individual All-round
 Pat Turner, Kevin Neufeld, Mark Evans, Grant Main, Paul Steele, J. Michael Evans, Dean Crawford, Blair Horn, and Brian McMahon – Rowing, Men's Eight with Coxswain ''(see also 1984 Canadian Mens Rowing Eight)'
 Linda Thom – Shooting, Women's 25 m Pistol
 Alex Baumann – Swimming, Men's 200 m Individual Medley
 Alex Baumann – Swimming, Men's 400 m Individual Medley
 Victor Davis – Swimming, Men's 200 m Breaststroke
 Anne Ottenbrite – Swimming, Women's 200 m Breaststroke

1980 Summer Olympics
Canada was one of the 64 nations to boycott the Moscow games, and did not compete in the summer games for the first time since 1896.

1976 Summer Olympics

Canada did not win any gold medals at the Montreal games; this was the only time that a host country for the summer Olympics failed to win at least one gold medal.

1972 Summer Olympics

Canada did not win any gold medals at the Munich games.

1968 Summer Olympics

Jim Day, Thomas Gayford, James Elder – Equestrian, Team Jumping Grand Prix

1964 Summer Olympics

Roger Jackson and George Hungerford – Rowing, Men's Coxless Pair

1960 Summer Olympics

Canada did not win any gold medals at the Rome games.

1956 Summer Olympics

Archibald MacKinnon, Lorne Loomer, Walter D'Hondt, and Donald Arnold – Rowing, Men's Coxless Four
Raymond Ouellette – Shooting, Men's 50 m Rifle Prone

1952 Summer Olympics

George Genereux – Shooting, Men's Trap

1948 Summer Olympics

Canada did not win any gold medals at the London games of 1948.

1936 Summer Olympics

Frank Amyot – Canoeing, Men's C-1 1000 m

1932 Summer Olympics

Duncan McNaughton – Athletics, Men's High Jump
Horace Gwynne – Boxing, Men's Bantamweight

1928 Summer Olympics

Percy Williams – Athletics, Men's 100 m
Percy Williams – Athletics, Men's 200 m
Ethel Catherwood – Athletics, Women's High Jump
Ethel Smith, Bobbie Rosenfeld, Myrtle Cook, Jane Bell – Athletics, Women's 4 × 100 m Relay

1924 Summer Olympics

Canada did not win any gold medals at the Paris games of 1924.

1920 Summer Olympics

Winnipeg Falcons – Ice Hockey
Earl Thomson – Athletics, Men's 110 m Hurdles
Bert Schneider – Boxing, Men's Welterweight

1912 Summer Olympics

George Goulding – Athletics, Men's 10 km Walk
George Hodgson – Swimming, Men's 400 m Freestyle
George Hodgson – Swimming, Men's 1500 m Freestyle

1908 Summer Olympics

Robert Kerr – Athletics, Men's 200 m
Canada – Lacrosse
Walter Ewing – Shooting, Men's Trap

1906 Summer Olympics

Billy Sherring – Athletics, Men's Marathon
The 1906 games in Athens are no longer considered official by the IOC.

1904 Summer Olympics

Etienne Desmarteau – Athletics, Men's 56 lb Weight Throw
George Lyon – Golf, Individual
Galt Football Club – Football
Winnipeg Shamrocks – Lacrosse

1900 Summer Olympics

George Orton – Athletics, 2500 m Steeplechase

1896 Summer Olympics

(no Canadians participated)

External links

International Olympic Committee results database
CBC Digital Archives – Golden Summers: Canada's Gold Medal Athletes 1984-2000
CBC Digital Archives – Gold Medal Athletes – 1948-1968

 
gold
Canadian Summer Olympics gold medalists
 Summer